John Wayne Muloin (born December 24, 1941 in Dryden, Ontario) is a Canadian retired professional ice hockey player who played 258 games in the World Hockey Association and 141 games in the National Hockey League between 1963 and 1976. Throughout his career he played for the: Detroit Red Wings, California Golden Seals, Minnesota North Stars, Cleveland Crusaders, Edmonton Oilers, Edmonton Flyers, Cincinnati Wings, St. Paul Rangers, Providence Reds, Vancouver Canucks, Oakland Seals, Cleveland Barons, Syracuse Blazers and Rhode Island Reds.

Career statistics

Regular season and playoffs

References

External links

1941 births
Living people
California Golden Seals players
Canadian ice hockey defencemen
Cincinnati Wings players
Cleveland Barons (1937–1973) players
Cleveland Crusaders players
Detroit Red Wings players
Edmonton Flyers (WHL) players
Edmonton Oil Kings (WCHL) players
Edmonton Oilers (WHA) players
Ice hockey people from Ontario
Minnesota North Stars players
Oakland Seals players
People from Dryden, Ontario
Providence Reds players
Rhode Island Reds players
St. Paul Rangers players
Vancouver Canucks (WHL) players